ConcurTaskTrees (CTT) is a notation for task model specifications useful to support design of interactive applications specifically tailored for user interface model-based design.

The main features of ConcurTaskTrees are:
 Hierarchical structure, which provides a large range of granularity in describing large and small task structures; 
 Graphical syntax, which reflects the logical structure in a tree-like form;
 Concurrent notation, which supports flexible ordering of the tasks to perform.

In Human-Computer Interaction, task models indicate the logical activities that an application should support to reach users’ goals. There are also methods that indicate how to derive user interfaces for different platforms from ConcurTaskTrees specifications  The last evolution has been the introduction of preconditions.

It has been used both in academia and industry, especially by companies with an interest in Enterprise resource planning (ERP) and safety-critical systems (e.g. air traffic control systems). . It has been considered in the World Wide Web Consortium (W3C) for standardization  of task models .

Some studies have investigated its usability 

ConcurTaskTrees has been mapped into Unified Modeling Language.

Tool Support 
The editing and analysis of task models is supported by the ConcurTaskTrees Environment (CTTE).
The executable code is publicly available and free to download.

References

External links 
 Leonel Nobrega, Jardim Nunes Nunes, Helder Coelho: "Mapping ConcurTaskTrees into UML 2.0", Interactive Systems Design Specification and Verification (2006), Volume 33, Issue 228. Springer. Pages: 237–248.
 Model-based User Interfaces Incubator Group: ConcurTaskTrees.
Fabio Paternò: "Using ConcurTaskTrees for Designing New Interactive Applications in an Industrial Context", ERCIM News No.31 - October 1997.
 
 Fabio Paternò: Publications Reporting Work in which ConcurTaskTrees (CTT) has been used.
 Ana Barbosa, Ana C.R. Paiva, José Creissac Campos: "Test case generation from mutated task models", EICS '11 Proceedings of the 3rd ACM SIGCHI symposium on Engineering interactive computing systems, pages 175–184.
http://www.cubeos.org/lectures/W/ln_9.pdf
 D. Reichart, A. Dittmar, P. Forbrig, M. Wurdel: Tool Support for Representing Task Models, Dialog Models and User-Interface Specifications", Interactive Systems. Design, Specification, and Verification. Lecture Notes in Computer Science Volume 5136, 2008, pp 92-95.
 Josefina Guerrero García, Jean Vanderdonckt, Juan Manuel González Calleros, Marco Winckler : "Towards a Library of Workflow User Interface Patterns". Interactive Systems. Design, Specification, and Verification. Lecture Notes in Computer Science Volume 5136, 2008, pp 96-101.
 Marco Blumendorf, Grzegorz Lehmann, Sebastian Feuerstack, Sahin Albayrak: "Executable Models for Human-Computer Interaction", Executable Models for Human-Computer Interaction. Lecture Notes in Computer Science Volume 5136, 2008, pp 238–251.
 Dan Diaper, Neville E. Stanton, eds.: The Handbook of Task Analysis for Human-computer Interaction, 2004.

Software design